Thomas O'Connor (3 November 1918 – 26 February 1997) was an Irish Gaelic footballer. At club level he played with Dingle GAA club and was an All-Ireland Championship-winning captain with the Kerry senior football team.

Playing career

Born in Dingle, O'Connor first enjoyed footballing success at provincial level as a student with Dingle CBS. He progressed to inter-county level as captain of the Kerry minor football team that lost to Louth in the 1936 All-Ireland final. O'Connor was a late addition to the Kerry senior team the following year and claimed his first All-Ireland Senior Football Championship medal after coming on as a substitute in the replay defeat of Cavan. He claimed a second All-Ireland winners' medal as Kerry's team captain in the 1939 All-Ireland championship, the first of three successive final victories. O'Connor won a fifth and final championship in the 1946 competition. During his 11-year inter-county career, he claimed eight Munster Championship medals. O'Connor was also involved in all six of Dingle's county senior championship victories, and was a two-time Railway Cup-winner with Munster.

Honours

Dingle
Kerry Senior Football Championship (6): 1938, 1940, 1941, 1943, 1944, 1948

Kerry
All-Ireland Senior Football Championship (5): 1937, 1939 (c), 1940, 1941, 1946
Munster Senior Football Championship (8): 1938, 1939 (c), 1940, 1941, 1942, -1946, 1947, 1948

Munster
Railway Cup (2): 1941, 1949

References

External link

 Tom "Gega" O'Connor profile at the Terrace Talk website

1918 births
1997 deaths
Dingle Gaelic footballers
Kerry inter-county Gaelic footballers
Munster inter-provincial Gaelic footballers